José Estevez Jr. (March 27, 1921 in New York City - March 7, 1988), professionally known as Joe Loco, was a Latin jazz and Latin pop pianist and arranger of Puerto Rican ancestry.

Life
Loco, maybe born José Estevez Jr. but officially known as Joseph Esteves, first played with an ensemble called Montecino's Happy Boys in 1938.  In the early 1940s, he served as Machito's pianist before joining the Air Force from 1945 to 1947.  He then freelanced with many of the top Latin ensembles of the time well into the 1950s, working with Polito Galíndez, Marcelino Guerra, Pupi Campo, and Julio Andino.  He scored a hit of his own in 1952 with the tune "Tenderly".  Loco also did Latin arrangements of pop standards, and performed them with a quintet in many jazz venues that did not typically showcase Latin music.

Discography
 El Baión (Tico, 1954)
 Loco Motion (Columbia 760, 1955)
 ¡Vaya! With Joe Loco (Columbia 827, 1956)
 Joe Loco in the Philippines (Villar, 1961)

See also
 List of Puerto Ricans

References
Footnotes

General references
 [ Joe Loco] at Allmusic

1921 births
1988 deaths
20th-century American male musicians
20th-century American pianists
American jazz pianists
American male pianists
Columbia Records artists
American male jazz musicians
Tico Records artists
American people of Puerto Rican descent